Javier Noriega Sanz (born 23 July 1980 in Toledo, Spain) is an Olympic-level freestyle and butterfly swimmer from Spain. He swam for his native country at the 2004 and 2008 Olympics.

At the 2004 Olympics, he finished in 13th place of the Men's  Freestyle, clocking 22.36 seconds in the semi finals.

See also
List of Spanish records in swimming

References
 2004 Olympics bio from the Spanish Olympic Committee

1980 births
Living people
Spanish male butterfly swimmers
Spanish male freestyle swimmers
Olympic swimmers of Spain
Swimmers at the 2004 Summer Olympics
Swimmers at the 2008 Summer Olympics

Mediterranean Games silver medalists for Spain
Swimmers at the 2005 Mediterranean Games
Mediterranean Games medalists in swimming
21st-century Spanish people